Healthcare in South Korea is universal, although a significant portion of healthcare is privately funded. South Korea's healthcare system is based on the National Health Insurance Service, a public health insurance program run by the Ministry of Health and Welfare to which South Koreans of sufficient income must pay contributions to in order to insure themselves and their dependants, and the Medical Aid Program, a social welfare program run by the central government and local governments to insure those unable to pay National Health Insurance contributions. In 2015, South Korea ranked first in the OECD for healthcare access. Satisfaction of healthcare has been consistently among the highest in the world – South Korea was rated as the second most efficient healthcare system by Bloomberg.

History 
After the Korean War ended in 1953, South Korea's medical infrastructure and healthcare system needed attention. To help Korea get back on its feet, the University of Minnesota and Seoul National University launched the Minnesota Project from 1955 to 1961. This project familiarized South Korean health professionals with medical methodology and cultivated a new wave of health leaders. It also increased public knowledge of proper sanitation and organized hospitals by the department. Due to the success it received, the Minnesota Project is accredited with pushing Korea's healthcare industry into what it is today.

In December of 1963, South Korea implemented their first health insurance law: the Medical Insurance Act. This allowed companies to provide voluntary health insurance to its employees. Then in 1977, the law was revised to make health insurance mandatory. President Park Chung-Hee also mandated employee medical insurance in firms of 500 or more employees and introduced the Medical Aid Program which provides medical services for low-income citizens. Insurance would then proceed to be provided for government workers in 1979 and self-employed individuals in 1981. Coverage would continue to expand, and in a mere 12 years, in 1989, national health insurance (NHI) extended to the entire country, providing universal health care for all citizens.

In 2000, the National Health Insurance Service (NHIS), was founded to combine all health insurances into a single national health insurer. As of 2006, about 96.3% of South Korea's total population is under the National Health Insurance Program (57.7% employee insured, 38.6% self-employed insured) while the remaining 3.7% of the population is covered by the Medical Aid Program.

Comparisons

The quality of South Korean healthcare has been ranked as being among the world's best. It had the OECD's highest colorectal cancer survival rate at 72.8%, significantly ahead of Denmark's 55.5% or the UK's 54.5%. It ranked second in cervical cancer survival rate at 76.8%, significantly ahead of Germany's 64.5% or the U.S. at 62.2%. Hemorrhagic stroke 30-day in-hospital mortality per 100 hospital discharges was the OECD's third lowest at 13.7 deaths, which was almost half the amount as the U.S. at 22.3 or France's 24 deaths. For Ischemic stroke, it ranked second at 3.4 deaths, which was almost a third of Australia's 9.4 or Canada's 9.7 deaths. South Korean hospitals ranked 4th for MRI units per capita and 6th for CT scanners per capita in the OECD. It also had the OECD's second largest number of hospital beds per 1000 people at 9.56 beds, which was over triple that of Sweden's 2.71, Canada's 2.75, the UK's 2.95, or the U.S. at 3.05 beds.

Health insurance system
Social health insurance was introduced with the 1977 National Health Insurance Act, which provided industrial workers in large corporations with health insurance. The program was expanded in 1979 to include other workers, such as government employees and private teachers. This program was thereafter progressively rolled out to the general public, finally achieving universal coverage in 1989. Despite being able to achieve universal health care, this program resulted in more equity issues within society as it grouped people into different categories based on demographic factors like geographical location and employment type. These different groups ultimately received different coverage from their respective healthcare providers.

The healthcare system was initially reliant on not-for-profit insurance societies to manage and provide health insurance coverage. As the program expanded from 1977 to 1989, the government decided to allow different insurance societies to provide coverage for different sections of the population in order to minimize government intervention in the health insurance system. This eventually produced a very inefficient system, which resulted in more than 350 different health insurance societies. A major healthcare financing reform in 2000 merged all medical societies into the National Health Insurance Service (NHIS). This new service became a single-payer healthcare system in 2004. The four-year delay occurred because of disagreements in the legislature on how to properly assess self-employed individuals in order to determine their contribution.

The insurance system is funded by contributions, government subsidies, and tobacco surcharges and the National Health Insurance Corporation is the main supervising institution. As of 1 January 2021, the applicable premium rate, including long-term care insurance, is approximately 7.65% of the monthly wages (currently capped at a monthly contribution of KRW 7,047,900 in total, subject to change in 2022); split equally between employers and employees at approximately 3.825% each. The employee contributions to the NHI program are deductible in calculating taxable income. The national government provides 14% of the total amount of funding and the tobacco surcharges account for 6% of the funding. The total expenditure on health insurance as a percentage of gross domestic product has increased from 4.0% in 2000 to 7.1% in 2014. 

The National Health Insurance Corporation, which is overseen by the Ministry of Health and Welfare, is responsible for providing healthcare through the National Health Insurance Service. South Koreans are required to contribute to the NHIS through payroll taxes to insure themselves and their dependants. An average of 5% of payroll is deducted out of employees' monthly incomes, divided between the employee and the employer. The self-employed are required to pay contributions through taxes based on their income level. Low-income households unable to pay National Health Insurance contributions receive health insurance through the Medical Aid Program. It is funded jointly by the central government and local governments, and local governments select the beneficiaries.

In 2014, total health expenditure per capita was $2,531, compared to a global average of $1058, and government expenditure on health per capita was $1368.

According to an NHIS survey, 77% of the population have private insurance. This is due to the fact that the national health plan covers at most 60% of each medical bill.

Hospitals

The number of hospital beds per 1000 population is 10, well above the OECD countries' average of 5.  According to Mark Britnell hospitals dominate the health system.  94% of hospitals (88% of beds) are privately owned. 30 of the 43 tertiary hospitals are run by private universities. 10 more are run by publicly-owned universities. Payment is made on a fee-for-service basis.  There is no direct government subsidy for hospitals.  This encourages hospitals to expand and discourages community services.

The Korea International Medical Association has been formed to encourage medical tourism. Nearly 400,000 medical tourists visited South Korea in 2013, a number which was projected to rise to 1 million by 2020. Compared to procedures done in the US, patients can save between 30 and 85% if they have the treatment in South Korea. It has been reported that some Korean hospitals charge foreign patients more than local patients due to customized service such as translation and airport pickup. As a result, some medical tourists have complained that this is unfair.

Problems 
South Korea's healthcare system faces a number of challenges, including health disparities between urban and rural areas, a lack of well-established primary care systems, an aging population that is likely to bring a higher burden of chronic diseases, overcrowding in hospitals and long wait times for appointments, and inadequate vaccination programmes. The South Korean government has failed to adequately address health disparities between urban and rural areas. Rural dwellers have a disproportionately greater burden of frailty and aging-related health conditions than those in urban communities. This is due to a number of factors, including the lack of access to private medical facilities in rural areas. The South Korean government has failed to provide adequate working conditions to physicians to address health disparities. The failure of the government have sparked opposition from medical workers, leading to strikes and public debate. The medical policy not to give adequate payment and working condition to medical workers caused shortage of medical workers in some specialities.

See also
 Health in South Korea
 LGBTQI health in South Korea
 Mental health in South Korea
 Suicide in South Korea

References